Devapattu is a village situated near the banks of the river Manimuttar. 
It falls under Sivaganga District and Karaikudi Taluk. It houses around 1000 people. It consists of Chinna Devapattu, Devapattu, Koilpatti and Mangampunjai.
It is the hometown of many people who from the grassroots level have risen to be notable people of the local community in and around Karaikudi.

Andarnatchi Amman Temple 
Andarnatchi Amman Temple is the Family-God of many people in and around Devapattu. It is considered to be a very powerful god. People visit the Amman on Fridays mostly. 
It is mandatory that the people have to be pure while visiting Andarnatchi Amman Temple. 
There is also a Manjuviratu which happens annually in the temple celebration. The worship of Andarnatchi Amman during full moon day is considered to be very auspicious.

Sangili karuppaiah temple
Sangili karuppaiah temple is the family-God of many people in and around Devapattu. It is considered to be a very powerful God like Andaranatchi Amman. There is no statue only an "aruva" (big knife) as symbol of God Sangili Karuppaiah.

References

External links
Map of Devapattu
Village census details

Villages in Sivaganga district